Sloanea gracilis is a species of plant in the Elaeocarpaceae family. It is endemic to Suriname.

References

Flora of Suriname
gracilis
Vulnerable plants
Endemic flora of Suriname
Taxonomy articles created by Polbot